Maggie Friedman is an American screenwriter and producer. She was the showrunner and executive producer of the Lifetime television fantasy-drama series Witches of East End. She also developed and produced the short-lived ABC series Eastwick in 2009.

She proposed The Thousandth Floor for ABC, but it never went past the development stage. She had a production company on its own, Curly Girly Productions.

Credits

References

External links
 
 

American women screenwriters
American television producers
American women television producers
American television writers
American women television writers
Living people
Showrunners
Year of birth missing (living people)
21st-century American women